The firecrowns are the genus Sephanoides of the hummingbirds. There are two species.

The green-backed firecrown occurs widely in  Argentina and Chile, but the Juan Fernández firecrown is found solely on Isla Róbinson Crusoe, one of a three-island archipelago belonging to Chile.

Both species will hang from flower petals or leaves with their feet. They feed on nectar and insects

References 

ITIS

 
Taxa named by George Robert Gray